Elroy Pappot (born 20 April 1993) is a Dutch former professional footballer who played as an attacking midfielder.

Club career
Pappot made his Eredivisie debut against Roda coming on as an 85th-minute substitute for Édouard Duplan. On 28 April 2013, he scored the winning goal against PEC Zwolle.

Personal life
In September 2015 Pappot returned to former youth club SDO Bussum.

References

External links
 
 Voetbal International profile 

1993 births
Living people
Footballers from Utrecht (city)
Association football midfielders
Dutch footballers
FC Utrecht players
Fortuna Sittard players
SDO Bussum players